Nick Johnston may refer to:

Nick Johnston (politician) (born 1948), member of the Scottish Parliament (1999–2001)
Nick Johnston (journalist), Australian journalist
Nick Johnston, singer with Cut Off Your Hands
Nick Johnston (guitarist) (born 1987), Canadian instrumental guitarist

See also
 Nick Johnson (disambiguation)